The seventh season of StarStruck, is a 2019 Philippine television reality talent competition show, was broadcast on GMA Network. Hosted by Dingdong Dantes and Jennylyn Mercado, it premiered on June 15, 2019. The council was composed of Heart Evangelista, Cherie Gil and Jose Manalo. The season ended with 28 episodes on September 15, 2019, having Shayne Sava and Kim de Leon as the Ultimate Survivors.

The series is streaming online on YouTube.

Overview

Auditions

In the last quarter of 2018, GMA Network announced the audition requirements and dates through a series of television plugs The StarStruck Experience TV commercials and website articles. For this season, the age limit is set from 16 to 21 years old. Much of the auditions were held at the GMA Network Center and at SM Supermalls throughout the Philippines.

The following dates and key cities for the auditions are as follows:

This season was directed by Monti Parungao and Rommel Gacho. Aside from the six seasons, The season marked the first time that can be only aired on weekends, with Saturdays and Sundays having either tests or elimination night. The show held its the Final Judgment on September 15, 2019, at the GMA Network Studio Annex (Studio 7).

A companion online show, Inside StarStruck, was hosted by Kyline Alcantara. It aired every weekday on the show's Facebook and YouTube accounts.

Selection process
In the seventh year of the reality-talent search, Out of numerous who auditioned nationwide, only the Top 80 dreamers were chosen for the call-back. The screening committee for this stage was composed of the Gina Alajar, Mark Reyes and Tony Tuviera. After which, the number was trimmed down to Top 40 for the Judges Preview, and finally, Top 22 hopefuls wherein the selected hopefuls will compete for a spot in final fourteen finalists as they face their Final Audition.

After the Final 14 were chosen, the season introduced a new twist called the Second Chance Challenge, wherein the Top 22 hopefuls who were originally eliminated in the Final Audition were given the opportunity to be reinstated in the competition by performing a dramatic acting test by pairs (male and female). Before the second live results, the council will select one male and one female contestant from the semi-finalists to advance in the finals after the elimination of the original batch of final fourteen hopefuls by each gender.

The new set of Final 14 underwent various workshops and trainings in order to develop their personalities, talents, and charisma. But, the twist is that every week, one or two of the final fourteen may have to say goodbye until only four remain. Those who were eliminated were dubbed as StarStruck Avengers.

The Final 4 will vied for the coveted the Ultimate Survivors titles, the Ultimate Male Survivor and Ultimate Female Survivor, both of them received P1,000,000 pesos each plus and a five year an exclusive management contract from GMA Network worth P5,000,000 pesos each, and a house and lot from (Lessandra) Camella Homes.

The First Prince and First Princess, both of them received P250,000 pesos each plus and an exclusive management contract from the network. The StarStruck Avengers (the losing contestants) also received an exclusive contract from the network..

It also featured two batches in StarStruck History, the original and new set of Final 14 in the third week.

Hopefuls

Final Audition
In this season, a new stage call the Final Audition was introduced wherein the Top 22 hopefuls were paired by twos or threes, according to their performances from previous stages. A hopeful will be given the chance to showcase his or her chosen talent, aside from an acting piece through a form of a video clip that will later be shown. The council will then pick one or two hopefuls that will qualify to the next round and will be included in the show's Final 14.

Color key:

Episode 1 (June 15, 2019)

Episode 2 (June 16, 2019)

Episode 3 (June 22, 2019)

Episode 4 (June 23, 2019)

Second Chance Challenge
After the first live results on June 30, 2019, the season introduced a new twist called the Second Chance Challenge, wherein the Top 22 hopefuls who were originally eliminated in the Final Auditions were given the opportunity to be reinstated in the competition by performing a dramatic acting test by pairs (male and female). Except, Nahuel Prieto and MJ Felizarta chose not to participate in this challenge.

Before the second live results, the council will select one male and one female contestant from the semi-finalists to advance in the finals after the elimination of Angelic Guzman and Gelo Alagban, the two original batches of final fourteen by each gender. Crystal Paras and Radson Flores were reinstated in the competition on July 7, 2019.

When the new set of Final 14 was chosen, they are assigned to different challenges every week that will hone their acting, singing, and dancing abilities. Every Saturday and Sunday, one is meant to leave the competition until there were just six others who are left. From final six, there will be two of them who will be eliminated and after the elimination the two; the final four' will be revealed.

The Final 4 will be battling with each other on the Final Judgment. People will choose who they want to win the competition by online voting via Google accounts and text voting. 50% of the result will come from the online and text votes and the remaining 50% is from the council.

Last Chance Challenge
Originally, two contestants will be sent home on August 4, 2019, Sunday live results, until the second twist of the season was introduced called the Last Chance Challenge. Ella Cristofani and Jeremy Sabido, who got the lowest combined scores, will be competing against next week's bottom two performers for a spot in the Final 8. From it, the council will then choose two hopefuls (one per gender) to advance in the completion.

The bottom two finalists from each gender will face Ella Cristofani and Jeremy Sabido in the last chance challenge to determine the council's vote to advance in the final eight. The host, Dingdong Dantes took over the council member, Jose Manalo to grade the contestants for this family remembrance scene to announce the council's vote to advance in the  final eight week, with the bottom two revealed, the contestants act out in their individual performances in a short play of an Ella Cristofani and Jeremy Sabido is the Challenger last week. Lexi Gonzles and Radson Flores is the bottom two this week. The council Save: Jeremy Sabido and Lexi Gonzles, while Ella Cristofani and Radson Flores was eliminated on August 11, 2019.

Color key:

Weekly Artista Tests
Color key:

Week 1-2: This season, a new stage call the Final Audition was introduced wherein the Top 22 hopefuls, the council was to select the Final 14 hopefuls.

Week 3: Acting Reacting
Mark A. Reyes instructed the Final 14 who were divided into pairs (one boy and one girl) to face the first challenge by acting in a small scene of any genre while focusing into the characters' reactions at the same time. The StarStruck alumni who were assigned to each pair's scene were Rich Asuncion, Katrina Halili, Liezel Lopez, Nikki Co, Dave Bornea, Chariz Solomon, and Dion Ignacio.

Second Chance Challenge

Week 4: Comedy Challenge
Michael V. and Bubble Gang writer and director Caesar Cosme assigned the finalists by pairs to perform two comedy skits with the show's cast and perform a short clip of a comedic reaction. Before the live results, the StarStruck council selected Radson Flores and Crystal Paras who won the Second Chance Challenge to advance in the Finals before the elimination of the two from the original Final 14 by each gender.

Original set of Final 14

Second Chance Challenger

New set of Final 14

Week 5: Sampal Serye and Direct Action
The finalists are grouped into twos and threes by gender on their on screen take set by director Gil Tejada with veteran actress Aiko Melendez. They are assigned with a different script and scenario for the boys and girls. The live results for the boys are revealed on July 13 while the girls on July 14.

Week 6: Kilabot Serye
The six remaining finalists are divided into two groups to act in a short thriller play challenged by Jorron Monroy, director of the upcoming afternoon drama series Hanggang sa Dulo ng Buhay Ko. The first group will act out in the school shooting scene with Gabby Eigenmann while the last group portrayed in the home invasion story with Kris Bernal.

Week 7: Hugot Challenge
The eleven finalists portrayed their on-screen heartbreak romance scenes with actors Ken Chan from My Special Tatay for the girls and Barbie Forteza from Kara Mia for the boys, instructed by director LA Madridejos. During the live results, the contestant with the lowest number of votes from the public and the StarStruck council will be sent to The Danger Seat before the final results are revealed on July 28.

Week 8: Conflict Challenge with Ms. Cherie Gil
Council member Cherie Gil was joined with Gina Alajar to direct the ten finalists who portray siblings (5 brothers and 5 sisters) with the actress in a family drama short play. The setting of the story was a family memorial. Originally, two contestants were sent home on the Sunday live results, until the second twist of the season was introduced called "The Last Chance Challenge". Jeremy Sabido and Ella Cristofani, who got the lowest combined scores will be competing against next week's bottom two performers for a spot in the Final 8. From it, the StarStruck council will then choose two hopefuls (one per gender) to advance in the competition.

Week 9: Action Challenge
Director Dominic Zapata instructs the eight finalists by pairs (one boy and one girl) to perform the scenes of a school fight with actress Jean Garcia who portrays the school principal. The bottom two finalists from each gender will face Cristofani and Sabido in the Last Chance Challenge to determine the council's vote to advance in the Top 8. Host Dingdong Dantes took over council member Jose Manalo to grade the contestants for this week. With the Bottom 2 revealed, the contestants act out in their individual performances in a short play of a family remembrance scene to announce the council's vote to advance in the Top 8.

Last Chance Challenger

Week 10: Fiction Drama Test
The final eight finalists used their skills of perception to portray in an Action-fantasy drama play instructed by Rico Gutierrez, director of Daig Kayo ng Lola Ko, with actress Rhian Ramos portraying the villain in two segments for the boys and girls. The girls portrayed witches fighting for the spell book against the evil witch while the boys portrayed superhuman mutants fighting against a rebel mutant. The Danger Seat was re-introduced on the Saturday night live results until the Sunday night live eliminations.

Week 11: Versatility Challenge
The 7 on 7 twist was introduced. The final seven finalists will be assisted and mentored by StarStruck graduates from previous seasons until the show's Final Judgment. As for their acting test, the hopefuls were tasked to test their versatility as actors and portray dual opposite roles. Helping them in this challenge were The Better Woman director Mark Sicat dela Cruz and actress Carmina Villaroel. The boys portrayed their dual roles with their ailing mother while the girls portrayed as a barrio worker and a mean rich sister.

Week 12: Star Perya Musical
As the battle for the Final 4 begins, the StarStruck alumni were tasked to guide the remaining six finalists in a musical play under the direction of theater director Rem Zamora. The musical Star Perya, featuring various music hits, stars the Final 6, together with the premiere comedians Kiray Celis, Cai Cortez, Gladys Guevarra, Betong Sumaya, and Pekto.

Week 13: Heavy Drama Challenge
The Final 6 finalists prepare for their last challenge before The Final Judgment next week. They have to act out in a Heavy Drama Challenge with the setting of the aftermath of a fire tragedy. Directed by Don Michael Perez, the finalists portrayed their characters searching for their younger sibling (played by Yuan Francisco for the boys and Leanne Bautista for the girls). The final results for this week are separated on Saturday for the boys and Sunday for the girls.

Week 14: The Final Judgment
On Saturday, the Final 4 survivors are interviewed by the StarStruck council who asked some of the hardest questions before performing their individual performances and face The Final Judgment. They portrayed their roles in their respective short films, both directed by Monti Parungao centering on youth. Allen and Kim portrayed brothers who are drug users, entitled "Pag-Uwi" while Lexi and Shayne portrayed in "Our Father" as grief-stricken sisters with mental disorders. The Ultimate Male and Female Survivors will each receive an exclusive management contract from GMA Network worth 5 million pesos, 1 million pesos cash, and a house and lot from Camella Homes.

Final Judgment
The winner was announced on a two-hour TV special dubbed as StarStruck: The Final Judgment was held live on September 15, 2019, at the GMA Network Studio Annex (Studio 7) on the same event.

Hosted by Dingdong Dantes and Jennylyn Mercado with the Insider host, Kyline Alcantara. The opening number consisted of the council formed with Heart Evangelista, Cherie Gil and Jose Manalo. Together with the ultimate final four performing American Authors's Best Day of My Life.

Before the female survivors sang Meghan Trainor's Better When I'm Dancin with Jennylyn Mercado and the Graduates mentors with Yasmien Kurdi mentor of Lexi Gonzales, Katrina Halili mentor of Shayne Sava, Mark Herras mentor of Kim de Leon and Kris Bernal mentor of Allen Ansay. The next intermission features the council's sang Bill Medley's  and Jennifer Warnes's (I’ve Had) The Time Of My Life before closing the opening performances with the dance performance of the  final four and their graduates mentors to the StarStruck theme sung by Kyline Alcantara.

The avengers votes their choice of Ultimate Survivors before performing their dance number with Kyline Alcantara. The special guest, Alden Richards performed December Avenue's Kung Di Rin Lang Ikaw with Lexi Gonzales and Shayne Sava. After commercial break, Alden Richards performed his dance number with Kim de Leon and Allen Ansay.  Before the final results, Aicelle Santos performed the StarStruck Journey song Fight For You while the final four and their mentors appears on stage followed by the avengers.

Announcement come, Kim de Leon of Balayan, Batangas is the Ultimate Male Survivor with a score of 97.4% and Shayne Sava of Binangonan, Rizal is the Ultimate Female Survivor with a score of 96.9% were proclaimed as the Ultimate Survivors,  each of them received P1,000,000 pesos each plus and a five year an exclusive management contract from GMA Network worth P5,000,000 pesos each, and a house and lot from (Lessandra) Camella Homes.

While, Allen Ansay of Sagñay, Camarines Sur is the First Prince with a score of 95.2% and Lexi Gonzales of Sampaloc, Manila is the First Princess with a score of 94.8% were proclaimed as the Runners-up, each of them received P250,000 pesos each plus and an exclusive management contract from the network. The StarStruck Avengers (the losing contestants) also received an exclusive contract from the network. Also received the graduates mentors with Mark Herras, Yasmien Kurdi, Katrina Halili and Kris Bernal received their special awards for their mentorship to the final four.

Signature dances
There are signature dances and songs made in each batch. With this batch, their signature dances and songs are:
Hey Julie!
Fight For You

Elimination chart
Color key:

Notes

 In this season, a new stage call the Final Audition was introduced wherein the Top 22 hopefuls were paired by twos or threes, according to their performances from previous stages. A hopeful will be given the chance to showcase his or her chosen talent, aside from an acting piece through a form of a video clip that will later be shown. The council will then pick one or two hopefuls that will qualify of the next round and will be included in the show's final fourteen. The first week (Saturday and Sunday) July 15–16, 2019 and second week (Saturday and Sunday) July 22–23, 2019.
 It was a non-elimination week. No bottom group was announced. Instead, Karl Aquino who got the lowest combined scores from the audience and judges was called to join Jerick Dolormente and Lexi Gonzales who were asked to remain on stage after their performance. The season introduces a new twist: The Second Chance Challenge when the Top 22 hopefuls (minus Felizarta and Prieto) perform a scene by pairs, one from each gender, for an opportunity to enter the Final 14 after the elimination of two of the original fourteen finalists from each gender next week.
 Radson Flores and Crystal Paras emerged in the Ultimate Final 14, and were both reinstated after the eliminations of Gelo Alagban and Angelic Guzman.
 Rere Madrid was sent to The Danger Seat after receiving the lowest number of votes from the public and the council. She was automatically eliminated after the final results are revealed.
 The Last Chance Challenge twist was introduced. Jeremy Sabido and Ella Cristofani, who got the lowest combined scores this week will be competing against next week's bottom two performers for a spot in the Final 8. From it, the StarStruck council will then choose two hopefuls (one per gender) to advance in the competition.
 Jeremy Sabido won the Last Chance Challenge after beating Radson Flores to reinstate in the competition. Lexi Gonzales remained in the Top 8 after winning the Last Chance Challenge over Ella Cristofani who was now eliminated along with Radson Flores.
 Pamela Prinster was sent to The Danger Seat after receiving the lowest number of votes from the public and the council but was automatically saved after Jeremy Sabido was re-eliminated on the final live results on Sunday.
 Dani Porter was sent to The Danger Seat after receiving the lowest number of votes from the public and the council before her elimination during the final Sunday live results.
 It was a non-elimination week. Scores this week will be combined with next week's final artists test scores which will determine the Ultimate Final 4. Only the highest combined scores were revealed.
 The Ultimate Final 4 was chosen separately on Saturday for the boys and Sunday for the girls. Abdul Raman was eliminated on September 7, 2019, followed by Pamela Prinster on September 8, 2019.
 In the final judgment night, Shayne Sava and Kim de Leon were proclaimed as the Ultimate Survivors.

References

External links
 
 

StarStruck (Philippine TV series)
2019 Philippine television seasons